The 1951 Washington University Bears football team was an American football team that represented Washington University in St. Louis as an independent during the 1951 college football season. Led by third-year head coach Irwin Uteritz, the Bears compiled a record of 5–4.

Schedule

References

Washington University
Washington University Bears football seasons
Washington University Bears football